Boker's Bitters was a brand of bitters manufactured by the L. J. Funke Company of New York City. The ingredient is specified in nearly every cocktail that called for bitters in Jerry Thomas' 1862 book, How to Mix Drinks or The Bon Vivant's Companion. Among the ingredients were cassia, cardamom, and bitter orange peel.

The Boker's company was a leading brand of bitters until the Pure Food and Drug Act of 1906 and eventually closed during the Prohibition era in the 1920s.

History
Johann Gottlieb Böker created the bitters in 1828. The Boker's company was a leading brand of bitters until the Pure Food and Drug Act of 1906 and eventually closed during the Prohibition era in the 1920s.

Until 2009, no samples of the bitters were known to exist, and as the recipe had never been published, recreating it seemed unlikely. That year, a man showed up at the London Bar Show with a small remaining sample, which was then combined with extensive research (including interviewing descendants of John Boker), to recreate a facsimile of the bitters. Consequentially, as a result of the collaborative effort of beverage aficionados, the likely recipe began circulating online, and several well-established, modern bitters brands began offering their own renditions of the Boker's recipe — whether in perpetuity or as a one-off.  Those brands include Philadelphia distillers, Dr. Adam Elmegirab, and The Bitter Truth.

Cocktails with Boker’s Bitters
Absinthe Cocktail
Champagne Cocktail
East India Cocktail
Faivre's Pousse Cafe
Fancy Brandy Cocktail
Gin Cocktail
Improved Cocktail
Japanese Cocktail
Jersey Cocktail
Knickerbein
Manhattan Cocktail
Martinez
Old Tom Gin Cocktail
St. Croix Crusta
Saratoga Cocktail
Sherry Wine and Bitters
Soda Cocktail
Vermouth Cocktail
Whiskey Cocktail
Whiskey Crusta

References

External links
 The Bitters Truth
 The Bitter Truth Bogart`s Bitters (Bokers Bitters Replica)
 Boker's Bitters
 Boker's Bitters - Dr. Adam Elmegirab
 Review: Dr Adam Elmegirab Bitters
 The Jerry Thomas Project: Dr. Adam Elmegirab's Bitters - The story...
 Boker's Bitters by Adam Elmegirab Review / Notes
 The New and Improved Illustrated Bartenders' Manual; Or: How to Mix Drinks of the Present Style
 Jerry Thomas' Bartenders Guide: How to Mix All Kinds of Plain and Fancy Drinks

Bitters
Defunct food and drink companies based in New York City